Marcia Gardner is an Australian screenwriter who has worked on such shows as The Doctor Blake Mysteries, Paradise Beach, Pacific Drive, Medivac, All Saints, Heartbreak High, Stingers (which she script produced), Blue Heelers and Sea Patrol. She's currently the Script Producer of drama series Wentworth.

References
http://www.australiantelevision.net/sea_patrol/index.html
http://www.australiantelevision.net/stingers/articles/script189.html
http://www.australiantelevision.net/hbh/series4.html

http://www.australiantelevision.net/as/series1.html

Australian television writers
Australian women television writers
Living people
Year of birth missing (living people)